Hazar (until 1999 known as Çeleken, also written Cheleken; ; Persian: Chaharken ) is a seaport town located on the Cheleken Peninsula of the Caspian Sea. It is directly subordinate to the city of Balkanabat in Balkan Province of western Turkmenistan. In November 2022, it was downgraded from city-with-district-status to a town.

Etymology
Hazar (also Khazar, a backformation of ) was the name of a Turkic people, the Khazars (viz.), who lived on the shores of the Caspian Sea and lent their tribal name to the body of water in several Turkic languages, including Turkmen. The current name of the city thus comes from the Turkmen name of the Caspian Sea. The former name, Çeleken (Cheleken), is the name of the former island, now peninsula, on which the city is located. The word comes from Persian chahar kan چهارکن, meaning "four wells" or "four riches", referring to the wealth of petroleum found on the peninsula.

Economy

Petroleum
This city and area are rich in petroleum oil reserves. As far back as 1st century, the Greek philosopher Strabo said, "They say, diggers opened oily springs near the Okh River. Indeed, if a country has alkaline, asphalt, sticky, sulfurous waters, it is most likely to have oily springs. Only, their scarceness makes this fact miraculous." In 1743, a Captain Woodruff of a British merchant company remarked that 36 Ogurdjali families resided on the island. They had 26 large boats and some oil wells.

Prior to 1917, the Moscow Society, Cheleken-Dagestan Society, Kuzmin and Co, Bostondjoglo, South Caucasian Mining Society, and Second Moscow Group were among established Russian oil companies. By 1925, after the establishment of Soviet Turkmenistan, wells had been nationalized and oil production decreased. By the late 1950s, oil production index went up again.

Dragon Oil, a petroleum extraction firm owned by Emirates National Oil Company, is the major employer in Hazar and operates the oil loading terminal there.

Iodine
Following planned renovations and upgrades, the Hazar iodine plant will have a design capacity of 300 tonnes of iodine, plus 4500 tonnes of bromine per year.

References

Hazar İnfo

External links 
 Picture of Hazar / Cheleken on Panoramio

Populated coastal places in Turkmenistan
Populated places in Balkan Region
Populated places established in 1956
Cities and towns built in the Soviet Union